Vasile Bătrânac (born 1925) is a Moldovan former educator and early Soviet dissident who was the head of the Arcașii lui Ștefan group in the Moldavian Soviet Socialist Republic shortly after World War II.

Biography 
Vasile Bătrânac was born in 1925 in what is now western Moldova. His father was Ion Bătrânac. In 1944, he was arrested for the first time for anti-Soviet activity. Following World War II, Bătrânac founded Arcașii lui Ștefan in Soroca in 1945, along with fellow teachers Victor Solovei, Nicolae Prăjină, Teodosie Guzun, Anton Romaşcan, and a student, Nichita Brumă. Bătrânac was the head of the organization. Vasile Plopeanu is a conspirative name that Bătrânac used while he was the head of the organization.

In March 1947, the organization had 140 members. On 23 March 1947, Bătrânac and co-leader Vasile Cvasniuc were arrested. On 11 June 1947, he was sentenced to 25 years and sent to Siberia.

Gallery

Bibliography
 Ştefan Tudor, Organizaţia Naţională din Basarabia "Arcașii lui Ștefan", Basarabia, 1992, nr.9
 Ştefan Tudor, O.N.B. "Arcașii lui Ștefan" în Literatura şi Arta, nr 14, 16, 19, 21, 24, 25, 26 1997, aprilie-iunie
 Mihail Ursachi, Organizatia Nationala Din Basarabia Arcașii lui Ștefan: Amintiri, Muzeum

References

External links 
 Rezistenţă armată anticomunistă
 Organizația Națională din Basarabia (ONB) “Arcașii lui Ștefan”

1925 births
Possibly living people
Romanian people of Moldovan descent
Moldovan independence activists
Moldovan anti-communists
History of Soroca
People from Soroca
Moldovan prisoners and detainees
Soviet dissidents
Soviet prisoners and detainees